Hanging Together is a 1985 Australian film about a television reporter who uses an impending marriage as a means to pursue his obsession.

References

External links

Australian television films
1985 television films
1985 films
1980s English-language films